The Grand Prix De Ster Sint-Niklaas or GP De Ster Sint-Niklaas is a cyclo-cross race held in Sint-Niklaas, Belgium. First held for men in the 2002–2003 season, it was traditionally held on 2 January. This caused troubles in the 2010–2011 season when it coincided with a cross in Tervuren, eventually leading to the cancelling of the event. The next season also did not see an edition. The event was held once again in the 2012–2013 season, this time in December. Since 2014 a race for women is organized as well.

Past winners

Men

Women

References
 results

External links
 

Cycle races in Belgium
Cyclo-cross races
Recurring sporting events established in 2003
2003 establishments in Belgium
Sport in East Flanders